Academics Plus Charter Schools (APCS) is an open-enrollment public charter school system in the Little Rock metropolitan area, United States; the Academics Plus Charter School District maintains its headquarters in Maumelle. It consists of three schools: Scott Charter School in Scott, Maumelle Charter Elementary School in Maumelle, and Maumelle Charter High School in Maumelle.

Academics Plus was chartered in 2001 as the first charter school in Arkansas. The charter was renewed in 2003 and 2007.

The Arkansas Department of Education classifies the school system as a school district.

Academics 
Based on the KIPP network of free, open-enrollment, college-preparatory schools, the KIPP curriculum meets or exceeds the Smart Core curriculum developed the Arkansas Department of Education (ADE), which requires students to complete 22 credit units before graduation. Students engage in regular and Advanced Placement (AP) coursework and exams, preparatory courses in ACT/SAT testing, leadership workshops, and partnerships with local colleges and universities.

Academics Plus has partnered with the University of Central Arkansas, the University of Arkansas at Little Rock and the University of Arkansas at Monticello to offer twelve concurrent credit courses in math, English, history and music. In 2011, a total of 210 concurrent credit hours were earned by the 23 graduating seniors.

Extracurricular activities 
The Academics Plus Charter School mascot and athletic emblem is the Falcon with school colors of navy and white.

Athletics 
The Academics Plus Falcons participate in various interscholastic activities in the 1A 5 North Conference administered by the Arkansas Activities Association. The school athletic activities include golf (boys/girls), cross country (boys/girls), bowling (boys/girls), cheer, basketball (boys/girls), soccer (boys/girls), tennis (boys/girls), and track (boys/girls).

References

External links 

 

2001 establishments in Arkansas
Charter schools in Arkansas
Public high schools in Arkansas
Public middle schools in Arkansas
Schools in Pulaski County, Arkansas
School districts in Arkansas